PS Cambria was a paddle steamer passenger vessel operated by the Chester and Holyhead Railway from 1848 to 1859 and the London and North Western Railway from 1859 to 1861.

History

She was built by John Laird of Birkenhead for the Chester and Holyhead Railway.

The Chester and Holyhead Railway was taken over by the London and North Western Railway in 1859. On 21 June 1873, Cambria ran into the steamship Duchess of Sutherland at Holyhead, severely damaging her. Cambria was scrapped in 1884.

References

1848 ships
Passenger ships of the United Kingdom
Steamships of the United Kingdom
Ships built on the River Mersey
Ships of the London and North Western Railway
Paddle steamers of the United Kingdom
Maritime incidents in September 1849